Larry Wade Carrell (born January 11, 1971) is an American actor, writer and director.  He is known for his horror movie Jacob (2011).  The film earned 16 awards worldwide including the Platinum Remi Award for Best Picture at the 45th Annual Worldfest International Film Festival. Jacob was well received by critics gaining Larry a solid fan base as a director and actor in the multimillion-dollar indie film world, and the film went on to be released worldwide. He lives in Houston, Texas.

Early life and career
Larry was the born in the small Texas town of Alvin to the parents of Frances and Wade Carrell. Larry Carrell's passion for entertaining began very early in life. Larry started playing guitar at age 3. By the age of 10 he was a talented guitarist, performing all over the state of Texas. Naturally, his love of music led to an interest in movies.

Filmography

References

External links 
 Official Website
 Official Movie Trailer for Jacob
 Larry Wade Carrell on Twitter
 Larry Wade Carrell on Facebook
 Crazed House

1971 births
Living people
American male film actors
American male television actors
American male screenwriters
Male actors from Houston
People from Alvin, Texas
Screenwriters from Texas
Writers from Houston